Barnsdale, or Barnsdale Forest, is an area of South and West Yorkshire, England. The area falls within the modern-day districts of Doncaster and Wakefield. Barnsdale was historically part of the West Riding of Yorkshire. Barnsdale lies in the immediate vicinity north and north-west of Doncaster, and which was formerly forested and a place of royal hunts, and also renowned as a haunt of the outlaw Robin Hood in early ballads.

Boundaries and features of Barnsdale
Barnsdale historically falls within the West Riding of Yorkshire.

The southern villages within Barnsdale are today part of the ceremonial county of South Yorkshire, more specifically part of the City of Doncaster, but the villages and hamlets of northern Barnsdale fall within the Metropolitan District of the City of Wakefield in the ceremonial county of West Yorkshire.

The small South Yorkshire village of Hampole is generally considered to lie within the dead centre of what was once the Barnsdale Forest area . It is recorded that Richard Rolle (1300–1349), the famous Latin and English religious writer and Bible translator, spent his final years at Hampole as a hermit, secluded in the dense forest.

The area was once thick woodland, rich with game and deer; and the monarchs of England are sometimes recorded as having gone on royal hunts in the Barnsdale forest. It is believed that at some point in the Early Middle Ages, Barnsdale Forest was probably huge and may have covered most of South Yorkshire (in the same manner as Sherwood Forest probably once covered most of Nottinghamshire).

Barnsdale Bar is the site of the junction of the A1 (the historic Great North Road), the A639, and Wrangbrook Lane, Woodfield Road and Long Lane (junction 38 of the A1). Now a service area lies just north of the junction, about eight miles north-northwest of Doncaster. Three limestone quarries exist nearby, and archeological digs at the site have turned up some fascinating materials, architecture, and preserved farmland dating back to the medieval era, the Dark Ages, and beyond.

All that now exists of Barnsdale Forest is small gatherings of trees at the side of the A1 trunk road at Barnsdale Bar .  There is however a wooded area around a half a mile wide, lying around a mile south of Hampole. It is called Hampole Wood, and although a small wood, the trees there may be direct descendants of the trees of Barnsdale Forest. The same could be said of the woodland that resides around a nearby stately home, Brodsworth Hall.  At Woodlands there is Hanging Wood, which was also part of Barnsdale Forest.

At Barnsdale Bar there is a 1,226 yard railway tunnel which, although closed to passenger traffic in 1932 and completely closed in 1959, is in remarkable condition and is part of the former Hull and Barnsley Railway.

Connections between the Barnsdale area and the Robin Hood legend 

In the earliest medieval ballads of Robin Hood, which date from the fifteenth century, the outlaw is stated as having made Barnsdale Forest his abode and base of operations (for example, in "Robin Hood and Guy of Gisbourne", and in "A Gest of Robyn Hode"). Notable locations within the forest of Barnsdale which are directly related to the Robin Hood legend include the villages of Wentbridge and Campsall.

There is also Robin Hood's Well, a small monument (apparently designed by John Vanbrugh) lying right next to the A1 between the Red House junction and Barnsdale Bar, in between the villages of Skelbrooke and Burghwallis. However, it was moved around 1960 when the junction was being constructed, so the real well is actually beneath the A1.

Yet another well – Little John's Well – lies to the west of Hampole, between Wrangbrook and Skelbrooke (but closer to the latter). It is also called Little John's Cave. Situated by the A638, to the west of Barnsdale, it was once engraved with the outlaw's name, but is now derelict.

South of Barnsdale Bar, the A1 follows the old Roman Road of Ermine Street – north of Barnsdale Bar the A639 follows the course of the Roman Road more closely whilst the A1 follows a more recent route. A number of villages and geological features along this route are mentioned in the early ballads of Robin Hood as being places the outlaw would visit. The town of Doncaster, farther south, is not mentioned directly, but is referred to by the names of David of Doncaster, a Merry Man in Robin Hood and the Golden Arrow, and Roger of Doncaster, a villain involved in Robin's murder in A Gest of Robyn Hode and Robin Hood's Death.
 
In Hanging Wood, also known as Highfields Wood, which lies between Hampole and Highfields,  a small stream known as Robin Hood's stream springs from underneath the Roman Road and runs into the Pick Burn.

The 'Woodlands' Model Village 
A feature of modern-day Barnsdale is the model village of Woodlands which lies about 4 miles south of Barnsdale Bar between the Roman Road and the historic Great North Road, here numbered as the A638 following the construction in 1960 of the A1(M) Doncaster by-pass.

References

Forests and woodlands of South Yorkshire
Geography of the Metropolitan Borough of Doncaster
Tourist attractions in Doncaster
Geography of the City of Wakefield